The McGehee transformation was introduced by Richard McGehee to study the triple collision singularity in the n-body problem.

The transformation blows up the single point in phase space where the collision occurs into a collision manifold, the phase space point is cut out and in its place a smooth manifold is pasted.  This allows the phase space singularity to be studied in detail.

What McGehee found was a distorted sphere with four horns pulled out to infinity and the points at their tips deleted. McGehee then went on to study the flow on the collision manifold.

References 
Celestial Encounters, The Origins of Chaos and Stability, Diacu/Holmes, Princeton Science Library

Classical mechanics